Thirumangalyam is a 1974 Indian Tamil-language film photographed and directed by A. Vincent. It stars Jayalalithaa and Muthuraman, and was also the former's 100th film as an actress. It is a remake of the 1973 Telugu film Jeevana Tarangalu. The film was released on 12 January 1974.

Plot

Cast 
 Jayalalithaa as Seetha
 R. Muthuraman
Sivakumar as Murali
 Major Sundarrajan
 Lakshmi as Lavanya
 Pandari Bai
 Nagesh
 Srikanth
 Sukumari
 Sachu
 K. C. Vijaya
 D. Ramanaidu
 V. S. Raghavan
Senthamarai
 Baby Sridevi as Shanthi

Soundtrack 
The music was composed by M. S. Viswanathan, with lyrics by Kannadasan.

Reception 
According to Sivakumar, the film failed as the concept proved to be unacceptable among Tamil audience. Nonetheless, Jayalalithaa won the Tamil Nadu State Film Award for Best Actress.

References

External links 
 

1970s Tamil-language films
1974 films
Films directed by A. Vincent
Films scored by M. S. Viswanathan
Tamil remakes of Telugu films